FK Radnički can refer to a number of football clubs in Serbia, Montenegro and Bosnia-Herzegovina. 

The name Radnički usually stems from the clubs' association with workers and labour unions. Similar club association or sports society existed in the Soviet Union and known as Spartak.

FK Radnički Bajmok, a Serbian football club based in Bajmok
FK Radnički Beograd, Serbian football club based in New Belgrade
FK Radnički Berane, Montenegrin football club based in Berane
FK Radnički Kovin, Serbian football club based in Kovin
FK Radnički Kragujevac, Serbian football club based in Kragujevac
FK Radnički Lukavac, Bosnia and Herzegovina football club based in Lukavac
FK Radnički Niš, Serbian football club based in Niš
FK Radnički Nova Pazova, Serbian football club based in Nova Pazova
FK Radnički Obrenovac, Serbian football club based in Obrenovac
FK Radnički Pirot, Serbian football club based in Pirot
FK Radnički Šid, Serbian football club based in Šid
FK Radnički Sombor, Serbian football club based in Sombor
FK Radnički Sremska Mitrovica, Serbian football club based in Sremska Mitrovica
FK Radnički Svilajnac, Serbian football club based in Svilajnac
FK Radnički Zrenjanin, a Serbian football club based in Zrenjanin

See also
FK Radnik Bijeljina, Bosnia and Herzegovina football club based in Bijeljina
FK Radnik Surdulica, Serbian football club based in Surdulica
NK Radnik Velika Gorica, a Croatian football club based in the town of Velika Gorica in Zagreb County
Spartak (disambiguation)